Happy Christmas Vol. 5 is the fifth album in the Happy Christmas series started by BEC Records in 1998.

Track listing

References

2010 Christmas albums
2010 compilation albums
Happy Christmas albums